The 2009 Belgian Cup Final, named Cofidis Cup after the sponsor, was played on Saturday, 23 May 2009 between Genk and KV Mechelen and won by Genk with 2–0. It was the 54th Belgian Cup Final.

Road to the Final

 Both clubs received a bye to round six.
 In square brackets is a letter that represents the opposition's division
 [D1] = Belgian First Division
 [D2] = Belgian Second Division
 [D3] = Belgian Third Division

Match details

Match rules
90 minutes
30 minutes of extra-time if necessary
Penalty shoot-out if scores still level
Maximum 7 named substitutes
Maximum of 3 substitutions

See also
2008–09 Belgian Cup

References

Cup
2009
K.V. Mechelen matches
K.R.C. Genk matches